Aegiridae is a taxonomic family of sea slugs, dorid nudibranchs, gastropod molluscs in the superfamily Polyceroidea.

This family has no subfamilies.

Genera
Genera in the family Aegiridae include:
 Genus Aegires Lovén, 1844 - the type genus of the family Aegiridae
 Genus Notodoris Bergh, 1875
 Genera brought into synonymy
 Aegirus Agassiz, 1846: synonym of Aegires Lovén, 1844
 Anaegires Odhner, 1934: synonym of Aegires Lovén, 1844
 Serigea F. Nordsieck, 1972: synonym of Aegires Lovén, 1844
 Triopella G.O. Sars, 1878: synonym of Aegires Lovén, 1844

References

 Vaught, K.C. (1989). A classification of the living Mollusca. American Malacologists: Melbourne, FL (USA). . XII, 195 pp.